Colón Sudeste–Abayubá is a composite barrio (neighbourhood or district) of Montevideo, Uruguay.

Geography
This barrio borders Lezica–Melilla and Colón Centro y Noroeste to the west, Canelones Department to the northwest and north, Manga–Toledo Chico to the east, and Peñarol–Lavalleja to the south.
 
Pueblo Abayubá is a town belonging to the Montevideo Department and one of the few populated areas of this department whose population was not included in the count of the city of Montevideo. It is a town that belongs to the southern suburbs of La Paz of the Canelones Department.

Population
In 2004, its population was 924.

Source: Instituto Nacional de Estadística de Uruguay

 Coordinates of Pueblo Abauba:

Places of worship
 Parish Church of St Mary Mother of the Church and St John Bosco, Av. Garzón 2024 (Roman Catholic, Salesians of Don Bosco)

See also 
Barrios of Montevideo

External links 

Colón, Intendencia de Montevideo

References

Barrios of Montevideo